Schmidts's big-eared bat (Micronycteris schmidtorum) is a bat species from South and Central America.

Description
Its ears are long with rounded tips.
Its dorsal fur is brown while its ventral fur light gray or whitish.

Biology and ecology
It is insectivorous, though it possibly also consumes fruit. It is nocturnal, roosting in sheltered places during the day such as hollow trees or in human structures.

Range and habitat
It is found in Belize, Bolivia, Brazil, Colombia Costa Rica, El Salvador, French Guiana, Guatemala, Honduras, Mexico, Nicaragua, Panama, Peru, and Venezuela. It is generally documented in lowland areas.

Conservation
As of 2016, it is assessed as a least-concern species by the IUCN.

References

Micronycteris
Bats of South America
Bats of Brazil
Mammals of Colombia
Mammals described in 1935
Bats of Central America
Taxa named by Colin Campbell Sanborn